Philip Hellström Bängs (born 24 March 2003) is an international speedway rider from Sweden.

Speedway career 
In 2021, Hellström Bängs helped Sweden qualify for the final of the 2021 Speedway of Nations (the World team Championships of speedway). He has made the Swedish Under 21 title podium in three successive years from 2020 to 2022.

He helped Valsarna win the Allsvenskan during the 2022 Swedish Speedway season.

References 

Living people
2003 births
Swedish speedway riders